Cruzeiro do Sul (Southern Cross) is a municipality located on the Juruá river in the west of the Brazilian state of Acre. It is the second-largest city in Acre.

It is bordered to the north by the state of Amazonas, to the south by Peru, to the east by the municipality of Porto Walter, to the west by the municipality of Rodrigues Alves, to the northwest by the municipality of Tarauacá, and to the northwest by the municipality of Mâncio Lima.

The municipality contains 23% of the  Serra do Divisor National Park, created in 1989.

Economy and buildings

The principal economic activity of the municipality is rubber extraction and export, as it was in the majority of the state of Acre. This business attracted many immigrants in the 20th century, including Germans. Of lesser importance is the farming of the commodities of cassava, coffee and rice. The city also operates as a regional trading center.

One of the city's most notable 20th-century structures is the Catedral Nossa Senhora da Glória. The parish was founded in 1915 by Spiritan priests, who established the first church in the Juruá valley. With more settlers, the territory was divided in 1930 and German priests were assigned to this area of the Upper Juruá.

Their influence was shown in the design of the current cathedral, which was begun in 1957; it opened in 1965. Its roof structure is said to be similar to a church in Cologne, Germany. The roof was constructed on site and raised by the workers. In 2015 the parish's centenary was celebrated with an exhibition of historic photographs and related lectures.

Transport

The town is served by Cruzeiro do Sul International Airport. The town is about 630 kilometres from Rio Branco by road, through the BR-364.

Geography and climate

Climate

Although the town has a tropical climate typical of Acre and the Amazon region (Köppen Am, bordering on Af as July receives just under  of rainfall) it is notable for sporadic cold spells not typically found in low-lying equatorial areas. The temperature has twice dropped below , once in May and once in November. This, combined with the high humidity year-round, leads to sweltering days.

Cruzeiro do Sul receives  on average annually and has a wet season that generally falls between October and April and a drier season from June to September. March, receiving  of rainfall on average, is the wettest month, while July is the driest month, receiving only  of rainfall. The wet season has 14-18 precipitation days on average, while the dry season has 6-8 precipitation days on average. March has the most precipitation days and July and August have the least. Humidity is high year round, but drops below 80% from July to September. Even for a rainforest location, sunshine is unusually low, with the city only receiving an average of 1337.5 hours of sunshine annually. This is even lower than places such as London. For comparison, Manaus receives 1,774.8 hours of sunshine despite being wetter. Sunshine is lowest from January to March, and it rises during the dry season. July is the sunniest month, receiving 182.3 hours of sunshine.

Gallery

References

External links

 Bem-vindo à Cruzeiro do Sul

Municipalities in Acre (state)